Dargye Monastery  is a Buddhist monastery in Garzê Tibetan Autonomous Prefecture, Kham, Sichuan, China. It belongs to Gelug school. Monastery was founded in 1642 by the Mongolian patrons.

References

Buddhist monasteries in Sichuan
Gelug monasteries and temples